Amy Louise Pemberton is a British actress. She portrays Gideon in the television series Legends of Tomorrow and voiced Elaena Glenmore in the Game of Thrones video game. She voiced Slone from Titanfall 2 (2016), and played Private Sally Morgan—a companion of the Seventh Doctor—in Big Finish Productions' Doctor Who audio plays.

Personal life 
Pemberton is from Stowmarket, Suffolk. Her father died in 2009.

Filmography

Film

Television

Video games

Theatre

Audio plays

References

External links 
 
 

British film actresses
British stage actresses
British television actresses
British video game actresses
British voice actresses
People from Stowmarket
Living people
21st-century British actresses
1988 births